This List of plants in the Gibraltar Botanic Gardens is based on data published by the gardens and updated annually. The gardens collection includes nearly 2,000 different species and over half of these are succulents. The gardens are noted for their collection of species from the African genus Aloe.

Acanthaceae

Adoxaceae
Sambucus nigra
Viburnum tinus

Aizoaceae

Amaranthaceae

Amaryllidaceae

Amaryllidaceae

Annonaceae
Annona cherimola

Apiaceae

Apocynaceae

Aquifoliaceae
Ilex aquifolium
Ilex aquifolium 'Handsworth New Silver'

Araceae

Araliaceae

Araucariaceae
Araucaria araucana
Araucaria columnaris
Wollemia nobilis

Arecaceae

Aristolochiaceae
Aristolochia baetica
Aristolochia gigantea

Asparagaceae

Aspleniaceae
Asplenium billotii
Asplenium nidus

Asteraceae

Balsaminaceae
Impatiens balansae
Impatiens walleriana

Begoniaceae
Begonia 'Lucerna'
Begonia luxurians

Berberidaceae

Betulaceae
Corylus avellana
Corylus avellana 'Contorta'

Bignoniaceae

Blechnaceae
Oceaniopteris gibba (syn. Blechnum gibbum)

Boraginaceae

Brassicaceae

Bromeliaceae

Burseraceae
Boswellia sacra
Bursera frenningae
Bursera microphylla

Buxaceae
Buxus balearica
Buxus sempervirens

Cactaceae

Campanulaceae

Cannabaceae
Celtis africana
Celtis australis
Celtis sinensis

Cannaceae
Canna indica
Canna × generalis

Capparaceae
Capparis spinosa
Euadenia eminens

Caprifoliaceae

Caryophyllaceae

Casuarinaceae
Casuarina equisetifolia
Casuarina littoralis

Celestraceae
Euonymus europaeus

Chenopodiaceae
Atriplex halimus
Enchylaena tomentosa

Cistaceae

Clusiaceae

Colchicaceae
Colchicum lusitanicum
Gloriosa superba

Commelinaceae

Convolvulaceae

Coriariaceae
Coriaria myrtifolia

Cornaceae
Cornus sanguinea

Corynocarpaceae
Corynocarpus laevigata

Costaceae
Costus comosus var. bakeri

Crassulaceae

Cucurbitaceae
Ibervillea sonorae
Kedrostis africana
Kedrostis nana

Cupressaceae

Cyathaceae
Cyathea arborea

Cycadaceae
Cycas circinalis
Cycas revoluta

Cyperaceae
Cyperus alternifolius
Cyperus papyrus

Davalliaceae
Davallia humeata
Davallia canariensis

Dicksoniaceae
Dicksonia antarctica

Didiereaceae
Alluaudia comosa
Alluaudia montagnacii
Didierea trollii

Dilleniaceae
Hibbertia grossulariifolia
Hibbertia scandens

Dipsacaceae
Scabiosa atropurpurea

Drosophyllaceae
Drosophyllum lusitanicum

Dryopteridaceae
Cyrtomium falcatum

Ebenaceae
Euclea natalensis

Echinocereus

Eleagnaceae
Elaeagnus pungens

Ephedraceae
Ephedra distachya
Ephedra fragilis
Ephedra nebrodensis

Ericaceae

Escalloniaceae
Escallonia 'Donard'

Euphorbiaceae

Fabaceae

Fagaceae

Ferocactus

Frankeniaceae
Frankenia laevis

Garryaceae
Aucuba japonica

Geraniaceae

Gesnariaceae
Sinningia sp.

Ginkgoaceae
Ginkgo biloba

Griseliniaceae
Griselinia racemosa

Grossulariaceae
Ribes nigrum
Ribes rubrum

Gymnocalycium

Haloragidaceae
Myriophyllum aquaticum

Hamamelidaceae
Loropetalum chinense var. rubrum

Hydrangeaceae
Hydrangea macrophylla

Hydrocharitaceae
Elodea canadensis

Iridaceae

Juglandaceae
Juglans regia

Lamiaceae

Liliaceae
Lilium sp.

Linaceae
Reinwardtia indica

Lomariopsidaceae
Nephrolepis exaltata

Lythraceae

Magnoliaceae
Liriodendron tulipifera
Magnolia grandiflora
Abutilon 'Canary Bird'

Malvaceae

Mammillaria

Meliaceae
Melia azederach

Melianthaceae
Melianthus major

Montiaceae
Cistanthe sp.

Moraceae

Musaceae
Ensete ventricosum
Musa cavendishii

Myoporaceae
Eremophila nivea
Myoporum pictum

Myrsinaceae
Cyclamen persicum

Myrtaceae

Nelumbonaceae
Nelumbo 'Albo striata'

Nyctaginaceae

Nymphaeaceae

Oleaceae

Onagraceae

Orchidaceae

Orobanchaceae
Orobanche minor
Orobanche ramosa

Oxalidaceae

Paeoniaceae
Paeonia sp.

Pandanaceae
Pandanus veitchii

Papaveraceae

Passifloraceae

Phrymaceae
Mazus reptans
Mimulus ringens

Phytolaccaceae
Phytolacca americana
Phytolacca dioica

Pinaceae

Piperaceae
Peperomia dolabriformis

Pittosporaceae

Plantaginaceae

Platanaceae
Platanus × acerifolia

Plumbaginaceae

Poaceae

Podocarpaceae
Podocarpus elatus
Podocarpus sp.

Polygalaceae

Polypodiaceae
Phlebodium aureum
Platycerium bifurcatum
Polypodium cambricum

Pontederiaceae
Pontederia cordata

Portulacaceae

Proteaceae

Pteridaceae
Adiantum capillus-veneris
Anogramma leptophylla

Ranunculaceae

Restionaceae
Elegia capensis

Rhamnaceae

Rosaceae

Rubiaceae

Rutaceae

Salicaceae

Santalaceae
Osyris quadripartita

Sapindaceae

Saxifragaceae
Saxifraga globulifera var. gibraltarica

Scrophulariaceae

Simaroubaceae
Ailanthus altissima

Simmondsiaceae
Simmondsia chinensis

Smilacaceae
Smilax aspera

Solanaceae

Strelitziaceae

Tamaricaceae
Tamarix africana
Tamarix boveana

Taxaceae

Theaceae
Camellia sp.

Theophrastaceae
Samolus valerandi

Thymelaeaceae

Tropaeolaceae
Tropaeolum majus

Ulmaceae
Ulmus minor

Urticaceae

Valerianaceae
Centranthus calcitrapae

Verbenaceae

Violaceae
Viola arborescens
Viola × wittrockiana

Vitaceae

Xanthorrhoeaceae

Zamiaceae

Zingiberaceae

References

Gibraltar Botanic Gardens